The Europe/Africa Zone was one of the three zones of the regional Davis Cup competition in 2017.

In the Europe/Africa Zone there were three different tiers, called groups, in which teams competed against each other to advance to the upper tier. Winners in Group II advanced to the Europe/Africa Zone Group I. Teams who lost their respective ties competed in the relegation play-offs, with winning teams remaining in Group II, whereas European and African teams who lost their play-offs were relegated respectively to the Europe and Africa Zone Group III in 2018.

Participating nations

Seeds: 
 
 
 
 
 
 
 
 

Remaining nations:

Draw

 and  promoted to Group I in 2018.

First round

Tunisia vs. Sweden

Cyprus vs. Turkey

Lithuania vs. Madagascar

Georgia vs. Finland

Latvia vs. Norway

Denmark vs. Morocco

South Africa vs. Estonia

Slovenia vs. Monaco

Second round

Turkey vs. Sweden

Georgia vs. Lithuania

Norway vs. Denmark

South Africa vs. Slovenia

Play-offs

Cyprus vs. Tunisia

Finland vs. Madagascar

Morocco vs. Latvia

Estonia vs. Monaco

Third round

Sweden vs. Lithuania

Denmark vs. South Africa

References

External links
Official Website

Europe/Africa Zone Group II
Davis Cup Europe/Africa Zone